Zach Paul John Clough (born 8 March 1995) is an English professional footballer who plays as an attacking midfielder for Adelaide United.

Clough started his career at Bolton Wanderers, having played for them since the age of eight. He established himself as a regular goal-scorer for Bolton, playing 68 games before being sold to Nottingham Forest. He later returned to Bolton on loan a year later, then had spells at different clubs in England. In February 2022, Clough signed for A-League Men side Adelaide United.

Early life
Clough was born and raised in Denton, Greater Manchester. He attended Audenshaw School where he lifted the U14 Premier League Cup at Manchester United's Old Trafford after beating Forest School 2–1.

Career

Bolton Wanderers
Clough came through the Bolton Wanderers academy having joined the club at the age of 8 then signing his first professional contract in April 2013. He made his debut for the first team aged 19 on 3 January 2015 when he started and scored the winning goal in a 1–0 home win against local rivals Wigan Athletic in the FA Cup third round. After the match Bolton manager Neil Lennon described Clough as a special player. Two days later he was rewarded with a contract extension until 2017. He scored two goals in three minutes on his senior league debut on 31 January against Wolverhampton Wanderers in a 2–2 draw. Clough won the penalty that gave Icelandic striker Eiður Guðjohnsen the opportunity to score the opening goal in a 2–1 loss at home to Liverpool in an FA Cup fourth round replay, after the match Fabrice Muamba described him as the best player on the pitch. On 28 February 2015, Clough scored a sixth goal in nine games in a match against Brighton to make him Bolton's leading scorer for the 2014–15 season. However, in a league match, at home to Reading, he was one of three Bolton players to go off injured in the first half; his injury, a dislocated shoulder, prevented him playing for the remainder of the season. Neil Lennon admitted the loss of Clough for the rest of the season was a huge blow for the club. His efforts of his first season saw him nominated for the MBNA Northwest Football Awards' 2015 Mob Sport Rising Star of the Year award and 10 months after signing his first contract extension on 19 October 2015, Clough signed another contract tying him to the club until the summer of 2019.

A month into the 2015–16 season, Clough dislocated his other shoulder and ruled him out for 3 months. In January 2016, a number of clubs including Everton  and Bristol City were interested in signing Clough. Bristol City had a £3,000,000 bid accepted however, Clough said that he wished to stay at Bolton so turned down his contract offer. Rumours circulated again in August 2016, clubs including Middlesbrough and Fulham were interested in signing Clough.

After scoring five goals in October 2016, Zach Clough was named League One player of the month. Of those five goals, two of them came against local team Bury FC in a 2–0 away win.

Nottingham Forest
On 30 January 2017, Clough transferred to Nottingham Forest on a four and a half year deal for an undisclosed fee, reported by the Nottingham Post to be £3,000,000. Clough made his debut for Forest on 4 February, starting a 2–1 victory over Aston Villa. His first goals for the club came in a 3–0 victory over eventual runners-up Brighton, albeit with Brighton's players claiming that Clough's opener came off the head of Britt Assombalonga, who had been stood in an offside position. On 18 March, Clough opened the scoring in the local derby match with fierce rivals Derby County, in an eventual 2–2 draw between the sides. Clough left the club 3 years after his last appearance when his contract was mutually terminated. He stated in an interview that “It was nothing to do with football, it was probably more finances." as the reason he didn't make an appearance in 3 years for the club.

Return to Bolton Wanderers (loan)

On transfer deadline day on 31 January 2018, Clough returned to Bolton Wanderers on loan until the end of the season, joined by Nottingham Forest teammate Tyler Walker; Clough replaced Walker after 58 minutes in their 1–0 victory over Bristol City to make his second Bolton début. He scored his first goal on returning to Bolton Wanderers against Sunderland in a 1–0 win on 20 February 2018.

Rochdale (loan)

On loan deadline day on 31 August 2018, Clough signed on loan for Rochdale until January 2019. He scored on his debut for Rochdale in a 2–1 EFL Trophy win over Bury on 4 September 2018. On 31 January 2019, Clough rejoined Rochdale on loan for the rest of the 2018–19 season. Clough said that during his loan at Rochdale, he picked up a lot of injuries which prevented him from playing as much as he had liked to.

Wigan Athletic
On 22 January 2021, Clough joined League One side Wigan Athletic on a short-term deal until the end of the 2020–21 season. Clough made his Wigan debut against Fleetwood Town in a 0–0 draw at the DW Stadium. He went on to score his first goal for the club on the final day of the 2020–21 season in a 4–3 home defeat to Swindon Town. On 26 May it was announced he would be released when his contract ends after 13 appearances for the club.

Carlisle United
On 22 June 2021, Clough joined League Two side Carlisle United on a two-year deal following his release by Wigan. He previously worked with Carlisle manager Chris Beech whilst on loan at Rochdale AFC.
Clough scored his first goal for the club in a 2–1 away loss to Hartlepool United. Clough made 23 appearances in all competitions for Carlisle before it was announced on 31 January 2022, that he left Carlisle on a free transfer in order to join an overseas club. It was not announced what country or club Clough would be joining.

Adelaide United
On 5 February 2022, it was announced that Clough had signed for A-League Men side Adelaide United on a contract until the end of the season. He made his debut for the club in a 1–1 draw away to Wellington Phoenix FC on 12 February 2022. Clough scored his first goal for Adelaide in the dramatic semi-final second leg tie against A-League Men side Melbourne City. This 48th-minute dink put Adelaide in front at AAMI Park, before City equalised in the 74th to take the game to extra-time.
On June 6, 2022, it was announced that Clough signed a new two-year contract, keeping him at the club until the end of the 2023–24 season. At the start of the 2022–23 season, Zach switched from the number 20 shirt to the number 10, vacated by Isaías Sánchez who also switched shirt numbers.

Career statistics

Honours
Individual
Football League One Player of the Month: October 2016

Notes

References

External links

Living people
1995 births
People from Denton, Greater Manchester
English footballers
Association football forwards
Bolton Wanderers F.C. players
Nottingham Forest F.C. players
Rochdale A.F.C. players
Wigan Athletic F.C. players
Carlisle United F.C. players
Adelaide United FC players
English Football League players
A-League Men players
English expatriate footballers
Expatriate soccer players in Australia
English expatriate sportspeople in Australia
Footballers from Manchester